Zami River is a river of Myanmar, arising at  in southern Kayin State.  It flows north past Kyondaw, Phadaw, Apalon, Kanni, Kyungyaung, Danon, Kyain Seikgyi and Chaunghanakwa, where it flows into Mon State. The Zami River is a tributary of the Ataran River, which on a grander scale is part of the Salween River Basin.

See also
List of rivers of Burma

External links
 Zami River books.google.com

 The Thailand-Burma Railway, 1942-1946:Documents, post-war books.google

Rivers of Myanmar